Parada may refer to:

Places

Portugal
 Parada (Alfândega da Fé), a civil parish in the municipality of Alfândega da Fé
 Parada (Almeida), a civil parish in the municipality of Almeida 
 Parada (Arcos de Valdevez), a civil parish in the municipality of Arcos de Valdevez
 Parada (Bragança), a civil parish in the municipality of Bragança
 Parada (Carregal do Sal), a civil parish in the municipality of Carregal do Sal
 Parada (Monção), a civil parish in the municipality of Monção
 Parada (Paredes de Coura), a civil parish in the municipality of Paredes de Coura
 Parada (Vila do Conde), a civil parish in the municipality of Vila do Conde
 Parada de Cima, a hamlet in the civil parish of Fonte de Angeão, municipality of Vagos

Other
 Parada (Kuršumlija), a village in Serbia
 Parada Kingdom, a tribe in ancient Central Asia
 Parada (dance move) in Argentine Tango
 Parada (Lindberg), a 2001 orchestral composition by Magnus Lindberg
 Parada (film), a 2011 Serbian film
 Parada (bug), a genus of lace bugs in the family Tingidae